Keanu Neal (born July 26, 1995) is an American football safety who is a free agent. He was selected by the Atlanta Falcons with the 17th overall pick in the 2016 NFL Draft. He played college football at Florida.

Early years
Neal attended South Sumter High School in Bushnell, Florida. He began playing as a linebacker before being switched to safety. As a junior, he tallied 151 tackles, 4 interceptions, one of which he returned 20 yards for a touchdown, as well as four forced fumbles, five pass deflections and one offensive touchdown as a goal-line fullback. He received All-conference and All-state honors.

As a senior, he had over 70 tackles and four interceptions. He committed to the University of Florida to play college football under head coach Will Muschamp.

College career
As a true freshman in 2013, he appeared in all 12 games as a reserve player, focusing mostly on special teams. He collected five special teams tackles. 

As a sophomore in 2014, he played in 10 games with eight starts at safety. He was injured in the fifth game against the University of Georgia and was forced to miss the next 2 contests. He posted 45 tackles and three interceptions. He had 10 tackles, one forced fumble, and one fumble recovery with a 45-yard return against the University of Alabama. He made 10 tackles against the University of Missouri. He had 8 tackles against East Carolina University.

As a junior in 2015, he started 11 of 12 games at safety under new head coach Jim McElwain. He missed the first 2 contests of the season with an injury. He recorded 96 tackles (third on the team), 51 solo tackles (led the team), 3.5 tackles for loss, one interception and 2 sacks. He has 14 tackles against the University of Tennessee and Louisiana State University. He declared for the 2016 NFL Draft at the end of the season.

Professional career

Atlanta Falcons

2016
Neal was selected by the Atlanta Falcons in the first round (17th overall) of the 2016 NFL Draft. He was the second safety selected in 2016 behind West Virginia's Karl Joseph (12th overall). On May 4, 2016, the Atlanta Falcons signed Neal to a fully guaranteed four-year, $10.73 million contract that includes a signing bonus of $6 million.

Throughout training camp, he competed for the job as the starting strong safety after it was left vacant due to the Falcons opting not to re-sign William Moore. He competed for the job against Kemal Ishmael and Charles Godfrey. On August 25, 2016, Neal recorded five solo tackles before leaving the Falcons' 17–6 loss at the Miami Dolphins in the second quarter after sustaining an injury. Neal sustained a knee injury after receiving a stiff arm while attempting to tackle Dolphins' running back Arian Foster during a 17-yard reception. The injury required surgery and sidelined him for the first two regular season games. Head coach Dan Quinn named Neal the starting strong safety to begin the regular season, alongside free safety Ricardo Allen.

He made his professional regular season debut and first career start in the Atlanta Falcons' Week 3 matchup at the New Orleans Saints and recorded four combined tackles and a pass deflection during their 45–32 victory. He made his first career tackle on the Saints' first offensive snap and tackled running back Mark Ingram II after a three-yard gain. On October 23, 2016, Neal recorded a season-high 11 combined tackles (five solo) in and a pass deflection during a 26–24 loss at the Seattle Seahawks. In Week 10, he made a season-high nine solo tackles and broke up a pass in the Falcons' 24–15 loss at the Philadelphia Eagles. On December 18, 2016, Neal tied his season-high with 11 combined tackles (five solo) and had a season-high two pass deflections during their 41–13 victory against the San Francisco 49ers.

The Atlanta Falcons finished first in the NFC South with an 11–5 record, while also clinching the number 2 seed in the NFC, and a first round bye in the playoffs. On January 13, 2017, Neal started his first career playoff game and led both teams with 11 combined tackles (ten solo) during the Falcons' 36–20 win against the Seattle Seahawks in the NFC Divisional Round. The following week, the Falcons defeated the Green Bay Packers 44–21 in the NFC Championship. On February 6, 2017, Neal collected 13 combined tackles (nine solo) during the Falcons' 34–28 overtime loss to the New England Patriots in Super Bowl LI. Defensive coordinator Richard Smith was fired after the Falcons' defense experienced a fourth quarter collapse and let the Patriots come back from a 19-point deficit in the fourth quarter.

2017
New Falcons' defensive coordinator Marquand Manuel opted to retain Neal and Allen as the starting safety duo to begin the regular season. In Week 7, Neal recorded a season-high ten combined tackles (six solo) and deflected a pass during a 23–7 loss at the New England Patriots. In Week 9, he collected eight combined tackles and forced two fumbles in Atlanta's 20–17 loss at the Carolina Panthers. On December 24, 2016, he tied his season-high with ten combined tackles (eight solo) and a pass deflection in the Falcons' 23–13 loss at the New Orleans Saints. The following week, Neal made five combined tackles, deflected a pass, and made his first career interception off a pass by quarterback Cam Newton during a 22–10 victory against the Carolina Panthers. He finished the  season with 116 combined tackles (83 solo), six pass deflections, three forced fumbles, and an interception in 16 games and 16 starts. He finished second in tackles for the Falcons, behind linebacker Deion Jones, and finished second in tackles among safeties behind Reshad Jones.

The Atlanta Falcons finished third in the NFC South with a 10–6 record. They received a wild card spot, but were eliminated from the playoffs after being defeated 15–10 by the eventual Super Bowl LII Champions the Philadelphia Eagles in the NFC Divisional Round. Neal recorded six combined tackles during their loss and had 14 combined total in both playoff games. On January 22, 2018, Neal was named to his first Pro Bowl as a replacement for safety Malcolm Jenkins due to his participation in Super Bowl LII with the Eagles.

2018
During the season opener against the Philadelphia Eagles, Neal left the game with a knee injury. He came back to the game only to leave the game again on a non-contact play. The next day, it was confirmed that Neal tore his ACL, and would miss the remainder of the season. He was placed on injured reserve on September 10, 2018.

2019
On April 24, 2019, the Falcons exercised the fifth-year option on Neal's contract. In third preseason game against the Washington Redskins, Neal dealt an illegal helmet-to-helmet hit against tight end Jordan Reed that ended Reed's season before it began. Neal was fined $28,075 by the NFL for his hit on Reed. Against the Indianapolis Colts in Week 3, Neal suffered a torn Achilles tendon just before halftime, ending his season prematurely for the second year in a row. He was placed on injured reserve on September 24, 2019.

2020
In Week 7 against the Detroit Lions, Neal led the team with 11 tackles (10 solo) and sacked Matthew Stafford once during the 23–22 loss.
In Week 16 against the Kansas City Chiefs, Neal recorded his first interception of the season off a pass thrown by wide receiver Sammy Watkins on a trick play during the 17–14 loss.

Dallas Cowboys
On April 14, 2021, Neal signed a one-year, $5 million contract with the Dallas Cowboys, reuniting with defensive coordinator Dan Quinn, who was his head coach with the Falcons. He was switched to weakside linebacker during organized team activities in May.

Tampa Bay Buccaneers
On April 6, 2022, Neal signed a one-year, $1.272 million contract with the Tampa Bay Buccaneers, switching back to strong safety.

NFL career statistics

Regular season

Postseason

Personal life
Keanu Neal is named after actor Keanu Reeves. His brother, Clinton Hart, played safety in the NFL. Neal’s mentor is former Seattle Seahawks safety Kam Chancellor. Neal keeps a signed Chancellor jersey in his locker to pay respect.

References

External links

Florida Gators bio

1995 births
Living people
People from Sumter County, Florida
Players of American football from Florida
Sportspeople from Greater Orlando
American football safeties
American football linebackers
Florida Gators football players
Atlanta Falcons players
Dallas Cowboys players
Tampa Bay Buccaneers players
National Conference Pro Bowl players